Kim Se-young (Hangul: 김세영, Hanja: 金洗瑩; born 4 June 1981 in Busan, Korea) is a South Korean professional volleyball player. She was part of the silver medal winning team at the 2010 Asian Games. She was part of the South Korea women's national volleyball team at the 2010 FIVB Volleyball Women's World Championship in Japan.

Biography
She is part of the Korea Ginseng Corporation. In 2011, Kim participated in the FIVB Volleyball Women's World Cup held in Japan.

References

External links

1981 births
Living people
South Korean women's volleyball players
Asian Games medalists in volleyball
Volleyball players at the 2006 Asian Games
Volleyball players at the 2010 Asian Games
Sportspeople from Busan
Asian Games silver medalists for South Korea
Medalists at the 2010 Asian Games